Tygers of Pan Tang (TOPT) are an English heavy metal band from Whitley Bay, North Tyneside. Formed in 1978, the group originally featured lead vocalist Mark Butcher who was replaced by Jess Cox, guitarist and backing vocalist Robb Weir, bassist and backing vocalist Richard "Rocky" Laws, and drummer Brian "Big" Dick. The group's current lineup includes Weir, drummer Craig Ellis (since 2000), vocalist Jacopo "Jack" Meille (since 2004), bassist Gavin Gray (since 2011). Jess Cox formed "Jess Cox's Tygers of Pan Tang" in 2015 and has featured members of Blitzkrieg.

History

1978–1987
TOPT were formed in 1978 by Robb Weir, Rocky Laws and Brian Dick, who added Mark Butcher after Weir briefly considered performing lead vocals. He was replaced before the end of the month by Jess Cox. During the recording of their debut album Wild Cat, the band decided to add a second guitarist, and after several auditions brought in John Sykes. After the album's promotional tour ended in October 1980, Cox suddenly left. He was replaced the following month by Jon Deverill. The new lineup released Spellbound  and Crazy Nights in 1981, before Sykes left to join Thin Lizzy and was replaced by former Penetration guitarist Fred Purser. Shortly after issuing The Cage in 1982, TOPT were dropped by MCA Records, and before the end of the year the group had disbanded.

In 1985, Deverill and Dick reformed TOPT with new members Steve Lamb, Neil Sheperd (both guitars) and Colin Irwin (bass), the latter of whom was soon replaced by Dave Donaldson in time for the recording of comeback album The Wreck-Age. Lamb had recently been a member of Robb Weir's band Sergeant, while both Sheperd and Donaldson had worked with former TOPT frontman Jess Cox in recent years. For the 1987 follow-up Burning in the Shade, Deverill, Lamb and Dick worked with songwriter Steve Thompson as a guest contributor, before breaking up for a second time.

1999 onwards
Jess Cox and Robb Weir reunited at Wacken Open Air festival in August 1999 to mark the 20th anniversary of the release of TOPT's first single "Don't Touch Me There", adding Blitzkrieg members Glenn S. Howes on guitar, Gavin Gray on bass and Chris Percy on drums. This led to a full reformation of the band the following year, with sole original member Weir joined by new vocalist Tony Liddell, guitarist Dean Robertson, bassist Brian West and drummer Craig Ellis. Shortly after the release of Mystical, the band's first studio album since 1987, Liddell was replaced by Angel Witch bassist Richie Wicks. The new vocalist remained until October 2004, recording Noises from the Cathouse before leaving due to "ongoing work commitments". Italian singer Jacopo Meille took over in December.

After releasing Animal Instinct in 2008, followed by a series of re-recordings of earlier material, West officially departed in November 2011 to focus on his duties as bass technician for Uriah Heep, with Gavin Gray returning to take his place. Ambush followed in 2012, before Robertson left at the beginning of 2013 to focus on other projects. He was replaced by Micky Crystal. In 2015 Jess Cox formed “Jess Cox’s Tygers of Pan Tang” and made festival appearances across Europe as well as a tour of South America.

Members

Current

Former

Timeline

Lineups

References

External links
Tygers of Pan Tang official website

Tygers of Pan Tang